Hager City is an unincorporated census-designated place located in the town of Trenton in Pierce County, Wisconsin, United States, across the Mississippi River from Red Wing, Minnesota. It is located near the intersection of State Highway 35 and U.S. Route 63. Hager City is served by the Ellsworth School District. As of the 2010 census, its population is 338.

Notes

External links
Industries in Hager City, Wisconsin
Google Maps showing Hager City

Census-designated places in Pierce County, Wisconsin
Census-designated places in Wisconsin
Wisconsin populated places on the Mississippi River